Erwin Spinnler (born 11 April 1947) is a retired German football player. He spent 6 seasons in the Bundesliga with Borussia Mönchengladbach and Kickers Offenbach.

Honours
 Bundesliga champion: 1970.

External links
 

1947 births
Living people
German footballers
Borussia Mönchengladbach players
Kickers Offenbach players
Bundesliga players
Association football defenders
Association football forwards